Maria Cândea (October 2, 1889 – April 16, 1974) was a Romanian French language and literature teacher, Doctor of Letters, who founded and led as School director the ″Queen Marie″ Normal School for Girls in Ploiești.

Life
She graduated from the Sorbonne in Paris with a Doctor of Letters degree, then worked as a French language teacher.

On November 10, 1918, she founded and led as School director the Girls' Preparatory School for Teachers in Gherghița. This educational unit was transformed into the ″Queen Marie″ Normal School for Girls in 1919, and in 1920 it moved to Ploiești under the leadership of Maria (Antoniade) Cândea to the place where it still operates today under the name ″Queen Marie″ National Pedagogical College.

She was married to Constantin Cândea (b. December 15, 1887, Mărgineni, Bacău County - d. March 4, 1971, Bucharest), Professor of Chemistry  Ph.D. Chemist, Rector at the Polytechnic University of Timișoara.

Maria (Antoniade) Cândea was the School director of the ″Queen Marie″ Normal School for Girls (now  ″Queen Marie″ National Pedagogical College) until the autumn of 1930, when she left for Timișoara.

She died on April 16, 1974, at the age of 84 and was buried in the Bellu cemetery, figure 4, in Bucharest.

Further reading
 Paul D. Popescu  „Women of Prahova, from today, yesterday and before – Maria Cândea” Part IV Prahova newspaper, May 22, 2012
 Prof. dr. Al. I. Bădulescu „Professor Emeritus Paul D. Popescu, 90 years since his birth” Prahova newspaper July 15, 2017
 Liviu Onu, Ileana Vîrtosu, Maria Rafailă - Scrisori către Ovid Densușianu, Volumul 1, (Letters to Ovid Densușianu, volume 1)  Minerva Publishing House, 1979, p. XI, 14, 15

References

People from Galați
1889 births
1974 deaths
Burials at Bellu Cemetery